"Parents Just Don't Understand" is the second single from DJ Jazzy Jeff & The Fresh Prince's second studio album, He's the DJ, I'm the Rapper. The song won a Grammy Award for Best Rap Performance at the 1989 Grammy Awards, one of the two songs to do so before the award was discontinued in 1991. It peaked at number 12 on the Billboard Hot 100. The song was released as a single in spring 1988. The song was referenced several times in the television show The Fresh Prince Of Bel-Air. The song was ranked number 96 on VH1's 100 Greatest Songs of Hip Hop, and featured in  The Parent Trap, Malibu's Most Wanted and Jersey Girl. A sample of the opening to Peter Frampton's "Won't you be my friend?" can be heard at the beginning and all throughout the song.

Composition
The song's two major verses involve The Fresh Prince's problems with his own parents, who he feels do not understand the difficulties of being a teenager. The first verse is a recollection of when he went school-shopping with his whole family, including his brother and their younger sister, at the Gallery Mall. The Prince's mother bought him a whole wardrobe that was way against his style, getting "Zips" shoes instead of Adidas, along with Sha Na Na-style outfits (with a brief mention of Bowzer), bell-bottom Brady Bunch trousers, double-knit reversible slacks, a $20.00 plaid shirt with a butterfly collar, and the like. His mother insists on buying all the articles of clothing she picked out for her son, in spite of his objections, stating, "You go to school to learn, not for a fashion show." The Prince soon tries to skip school on the first day by faking an illness (the music video shows him heating a thermometer with a lighter) so that he cannot go, with little success. Forced to wear such uncool clothes, The Fresh Prince suffers inevitable embarrassment on his first day at school.

The second verse consists of the Prince recalling what happened when he took the family Porsche out for a drive while his parents were on vacation (but he didn't have his driver's license yet). He picked up a beautiful young girl and took her to McDonald's. When the Prince floored the car to show how fast it could go, he was pulled over for speeding, and discovered that the beauty he picked up was a tween runaway. The police arrested him for driving without a license and the Porsche was impounded. The Prince's parents were forced to come home early from vacation in order to bail him out; they angrily assaulted him on the drive home. Nevertheless, the Fresh Prince tells his audience that "parents just don't understand."

Notable cover versions
Lil' Romeo, 3LW, and Nick Cannon recorded a cover for the Jimmy Neutron: Boy Genius soundtrack. T-Squad covered the song on their only album T-Squad.

Track listing
 7" Vinyl
 "Parents Just Don't Understand" – 4:13
 "Parents Just Don't Understand" (Instrumental) – 4:06

 12" Vinyl
 "Parents Just Don't Understand" (Danny D Mix) – 6:20
 "Parents Just Don't Understand" (Original 7" Version) – 5:13
 "Live At Union Square, November 1986" – 4:03

 American 12" Vinyl
 "Parents Just Don't Understand" (Extended Mix) – 5:27
 "Parents Just Don't Understand" (Single Edit) – 4:13
 "Parents Just Don't Understand" (Instrumental) – 4:06
 "Live At Union Square, November 1986" – 4:03

Charts

Certifications

References

External links

Songs about parenthood
1988 singles
1988 songs
DJ Jazzy Jeff & The Fresh Prince songs
3LW songs
Grammy Award for Best Rap Performance
Songs written by DJ Jazzy Jeff
Songs written by Will Smith